Gabriele Frangipani (born 31 December 2001) is an Italian figure skater. He is the 2019 Toruń Cup silver medalist, the 2020 Nebelhorn Trophy silver medalist, three-time Italian national bronze medalist (2021-2023), two-time Italian national junior champion (2019, 2020). 

He has competed and finished in the top fifteen at two European Figure Skating Championships (2020, 2023).

Programs

Competitive highlights 
GP: Grand Prix; CS: Challenger Series; JGP: Junior Grand Prix

Detailed results

Senior level
Small medals for short and free programs awarded only at ISU Championships. At team events, medals awarded for team results only.

References

External links 
 

2001 births
Italian male single skaters
Living people
Sportspeople from Pisa